Silla Carron, 62, is a British community activist from Camden Town, London, UK.

Biography
Carron was prominent in leading residents' participation in improving their living environment and reducing crime and anti-social behaviour (ASB).  She led campaigns in Camden, Plymouth, and Bristol, aiming at turning around sink estates with high levels of crime, vandalism and drug-taking.  She has appeared in two series of the BBC One programme, The Estate We're In in 2008 and 2010.  The programme has won a number of broadcast industry awards including RTS Best Daytime Programme.  An article in The Daily Telegraph alleged that some scenes in the 2010 series of The Estate We're In were filmed in a different estate in Bristol to that claimed in the programme.

Carron has received a number of awards in recognition of her community action work, including the 'Neighbour of the Year Award' in the 2006 Pride of Britain Awards.

References

People from Camden Town
Living people
Year of birth missing (living people)